Eric or Erik Bennett may refer to: 
 Eric Bennett (archer) (born 1973), American Paralympic archer
 Erik Bennett (baseball) (born 1968), American baseball player
 Erik Bennett (Royal Air Force officer) (1928–2022), Sultan of Oman's Air Force air marshal
 Eric Bennett (rugby league), Australian rugby league player